Planyavsky is an Austrian surname. Notable people with the surname include:

Alfred Planyavsky (1924–2013), Austrian double-bassist and music historian
Peter Planyavsky (born 1947), Austrian organist and composer

German-language surnames